Cristian Moreno Panezo (born September 22, 1970) is a Colombian politician and lawyer from the Universidad del Atlantico with a specialization in constitutional law from the National University of Colombia. On October 28, 2007 Moreno was elected as Governor of Cesar Department for the period 2008-2011. He became the first independent candidate to win in the Cesar Department.

Early years

Moreno started his political career after running for the Department Assembly of Cesar (Asamblea Departamental del Cesar) and was elected deputy for which he served one term. He was later appointed Regional Director of the National Service of Apprenticeship (Servicio Nacional de Aprendizaje, SENA) in Valledupar and later as advisor to the IberoAmerican States Organization (Organización de Estados Iberoamericanos, OEI).

First candidacy for Governor of Cesar Department

Moreno became notable in the local politics of Cesar Department during the 2003 Colombian regional election, when he ran for the governorship of Cesar Department against Hernando Molina Araújo and Abraham Jose Romero. During this elections paramilitary groups associated to the United Self-Defense Forces of Colombia (AUC) and led by Rodrigo Tovar Pupo threatened him and Romero in order to benefit candidate Molina, who was the candidate of their choice. Both candidates retreated from the race alleging that the electoral process was rigged.

Second candidacy for Governor of Cesar Department

In 2007 Moreno postulated his name again for the governorship of Cesar Department during the Colombian regional election in representation of the Partido Verde – Opción Centro political party. On September 24, 2007 Moreno signed an agreement with the Alternative Democratic Pole (PDA) and summoned political forces in Cesar Department.

On October 28, 2007 Moreno was elected by the largest difference in an election for governor in the Cesar Department obtaining 140,789 votes against the candidates Arturo Calderón, 93,739 votes and Jaime Murgas Arzuaga with 47,746 votes. He became the first independent candidate to win in the Cesar Department history, traditionally dominated by traditional parties such as the Liberal and Conservative parties.

References

1970 births
Living people
20th-century Colombian lawyers
Governors of Cesar Department
People from Bogotá
Green Alliance (Colombia) politicians
21st-century Colombian politicians